Pustulatirus attenuatus is a species of sea snail, a marine gastropod mollusk in the family Fasciolariidae, the spindle snails, the tulip snails and their allies.

References

External links
  Reeve, L. A. (1847). Monograph of the genus Turbinella. In: Conchologia Iconica, or, illustrations of the shells of molluscous animals, vol. 4, pl. 1–13 and unpaginated text. L. Reeve & Co.,
 Lyons, W. G.; Snyder, M. A. (2013). The Genus Pustulatirus Vermeij and Snyder, 2006 (Gastropoda: Fasciolariidae: Peristerniinae) in the Western Atlantic, with Descriptions of Three New Species. Zootaxa. 3636(1): 35

Fasciolariidae
Gastropods described in 1847